Dioscorea althaeoides is a herbaceous vine in the genus Dioscorea which is indigenous to the Guizhou, Sichuan, and eastern Xizang provinces of China, in addition to the Yunnan area in Thailand. A formerly unknown acetylated spirostanol saponin, dioscin-6′-O-acetate, has been discovered in the rhizomes of the plant.

References

althaeoides